Argentipallium is a genus of flowering plants in the family Asteraceae. The genus, which is endemic to Australia, was first formally described in 1992 by Paul G. Wilson in the botanical journal Nutsyia.

 Species
 Argentipallium blandowskianum (Steetz ex Sonder) Paul G.Wilson
 Argentipallium dealbatum (Labill.) Paul G.Wilson
 Argentipallium niveum (Steetz) Paul G.Wilson
 Argentipallium obtusifolium (Sonder) Paul G.Wilson
 Argentipallium spiceri (F.Muell.) Paul G.Wilson
 Argentipallium tephrodes (Turcz.) Paul G.Wilson

References

 
Asteraceae genera
Endemic flora of Australia
Taxa named by Paul G. Wilson